This article contains records and statistics for the Chinese professional football club, Shandong Taishan F.C.

Domestic league competitions

Domestic cup competitions

Major international competitions

Top scorers by season

International Games

References

Shandong Taishan F.C.